Shadows and Light is a 1980 live double album by the Canadian singer-songwriter Joni Mitchell. It was recorded at the Santa Barbara Bowl in September 1979 on Mitchell's Mingus tour. It was released as an LP on October 25, 1980, on the Asylum label. A film of the concert was also released on VHS, LaserDisc and DVD in 2003.

Track listing
All tracks composed by Joni Mitchell, except where indicated

Personnel 
Musicians
 Joni Mitchell – electric guitar, vocals
 Pat Metheny – lead guitar
 Jaco Pastorius – electric bass (Fender Jazz)
 Don Alias – drums, percussion
 Lyle Mays – electric piano (Rhodes), synthesizer (Oberheim FVS-1) 
 Michael Brecker – saxophones
 The Persuasions – backing vocals on "Why Do Fools Fall in Love" and "Shadows and Light"
 Toller Cranston – skates

Production
 Andy Johns – engineer (recording)
 Bernie Grundman – engineer (mastering)
 Glen Cristensen – art direction, photography
 Joel Bernstein – photography

Charts

References

Joni Mitchell live albums
Concert films
1980 live albums
Asylum Records live albums